The 2018 VFL Women's season was the third season of the VFL Women's (VFLW). The season commenced on 5 May and concluded with the Grand Final on 23 September 2018. The competition was contested by thirteen clubs.

Clubs
Significant overhaul and changes were made to composition of the competition ahead of the 2018 season. With the establishment of the national AFL Women's competition in 2017, the league sought to affiliate clubs more closely to existing AFL/AFLW clubs. Consequently five foundation clubs departed; leaving Darebin, Melbourne University and VU Western Spurs (who were taken over by and renamed the Western Bulldogs to align with the AFL club) as the remaining clubs. The thirteen clubs were as follows:

Ladder

Finals series

Semi-finals

Preliminary final

Grand Final

Awards
 Lambert-Pearce Medal (Best and Fairest): Jess Duffin (Williamstown)
 Rohenna Young Medal (Leading Goal kicker): Darcy Vescio (Carlton) – 26 goals
 Debbie Lee Medal (Rising Star): Jayde Van Dyk (Hawthorn)
 Coach of the Year: Penny Cula-Reid (Collingwood)
 Lisa Hardeman Medal (Best on ground VFL Women's Grand Final): Chantella Perera (Hawthorn)

References